Andrew William Pollett (born 12 March 1960) is a former Australian rules footballer who played for the Footscray Football Club in the Victorian Football League (VFL).

Notes

External links 
		

Living people
1960 births
Australian rules footballers from Victoria (Australia)
Western Bulldogs players
Sale Football Club players